The National Patriotic Party (NPP) is a political party in Liberia. It was formed in 1997 by members of the National Patriotic Front of Liberia following the end of the First Liberian Civil War.

History
The party contested the 1997 general election, with the NPFL's leader, Charles Taylor, serving as the party's presidential candidate. Taylor won the presidential election with 75% of the vote. The party also won 49 of 64 seats in the House of Representatives and 21 of 26 in the Senate. Due to domestic and international pressure as a result of the Second Liberian Civil War, Taylor stepped down as president in August 2003. In October of that year, Taylor's successor, Moses Blah, and the members of the Legislature resigned and ceded power to the National Transitional Government of Liberia.

The party later contested the 2005 general election. The party's presidential candidate was Roland Massaquoi, who earned 4.1% of the vote. The NPP also won four seats in the House of Representatives and another four in the Senate.

In 2017 it was found that Charles Taylor was continuing to guide the party via phone calls from prison.

References

External links
Country profile: Liberia
Timeline: Liberia

1997 establishments in Liberia
Nationalist parties in Africa
Political parties established in 1997
Political parties in Liberia